Presidential elections were held in France on 21 April 2002, with a runoff election between the top two candidates, incumbent Jacques Chirac of the Rally for the Republic and Jean-Marie Le Pen of the National Front, on 5 May. This presidential contest attracted a greater than usual amount of international attention because of far-right candidate Le Pen's unexpected appearance in the runoff election.

Chirac ran for a second term, reduced to five years instead of seven previously by a 2000 referendum, emphasising a strong economy (mostly unaffected by downturns in Germany and the United States). It was widely expected that Chirac and Lionel Jospin, the outgoing cohabitation Prime Minister and nominee of the Socialist Party, would be the most popular candidates in the first round, thus going on to face each other in the runoff, with opinion polls showing a hypothetical Chirac versus Jospin second round too close to call. However, Jospin unexpectedly finished in third place behind Le Pen. Journalists and politicians claimed polls had failed to predict Le Pen's second-place finish in the general election, though his strong stance could be seen in the week prior to the election. This led to serious discussions about polling techniques and the climate of French politics.

Although Le Pen's political party, the National Front, described itself as mainstream conservative, non-partisan observers largely agreed in defining it as a far-right and nationalist party. As a protest, almost all French political parties called for their supporters to vote against Le Pen, most notably the Socialists, who were traditionally billed as the archrivals to Chirac's party. Chirac thus went on to win in the largest landslide in a presidential election in French history (greater even than that of Louis-Napoléon Bonaparte in 1848, the first by direct ballot), winning over 82% of the vote.

The National Front would not appear again in the second round of the presidential election until 2017. After Chirac's victory, no French President would win a second term until Emmanuel Macron in 2022.

Background
The 2002 election was the first for which the President would be elected to a five-year, instead of a seven-year, term.

In the months before the election, the campaign had increasingly focused on questions of law and order, with a particular focus on crimes committed by young people, especially those of foreign origin. Lionel Jospin was, at the time, Prime Minister of France; the Jospin government was criticised for its "softness" on crime by its political opponents. Reporting on the TF1 and France2 television channel and other media also emphasized the alleged crime wave.

Opinion polls

First round 

Second round (Chirac–Jospin)

Results
The first round of the election (on 21 April), which saw an exceptional number of 16 candidates, came as a shock to many commentators, almost all of whom had expected the second ballot to be between Jacques Chirac and Lionel Jospin. Indeed, it was this very expectation that led to Jospin's downfall, with a plethora of "small party" left candidates (independent socialists and republicans, Green, Communist, Trotskyist, radical etc.) all intending to support him in the second round, but to raise their profile in the first, like Jean-Pierre Chevènement and Christiane Taubira. They cumulatively took enough votes away from Jospin to (unintentionally) prevent him from reaching the second round, which he could have won. Instead Jean-Marie Le Pen faced Chirac in the second ballot. The election brought the opinion polls and two-round voting system into question as well as raising many concerns about apathy and the way in which the left had become so divided as a result of the over democratical refusal of Jospin to strategically ask the nearest small parties of his own government coalition to withdraw, like the preceding leaders of the left had done for such an election.

There was a widespread stirring of national public opinion, and more than one million people in France took part in street rallies, in an expression of fierce opposition to Le Pen's ideas. Some held up protest signs stating "I'm ashamed to be French," which parodied Le Pen's party slogan, "Proud to be French." Spontaneous street protests began in the night from 21 to 22 April, then on 22 April and 23, then as follows:

 24 April: 60,000 people in the streets protesting against Le Pen's success
 25 April: 250,000 people in the streets protesting against Le Pen's success
 27 April: 200,000 people in the streets protesting against Le Pen's success (including 45,000 in Paris)
 1 May:
 Approximately 20,000 people turned out for the National Front's yearly demonstration in Paris in honor of Joan of Arc and in support of Le Pen.
 Between 900,000 (according to the Ministry of the Interior) and 1,300,000 people (according to syndicates) turned up to the Labor Day demonstrations and against the National Front. Hundreds of thousands of people who normally did not take part in such demonstrations came, in addition to the usual unions. In Paris, 500,000 people were seen in the streets, one of the greatest protest since the Liberation of Paris; the march was so big it had to be divided in three parts to reach the place de la Bastille. In another unusual sight for 1 May demonstrations, French tricolour flags were commonplace.

The choice between Chirac, who was under suspicion for actions carried out whilst he was mayor of Paris but benefited from Presidential immunity as long as he stayed president, and Le Pen, a nationalist often accused of racism and antisemitism, was one that many found tough. Some people suggested going to vote with a clothes peg on their noses to express disgust when voting for Chirac, but this may have been illegal, because it is prohibited to advertise one's vote inside the voting precinct. In the days before the second ballot, a memorable poster was put up of Chirac with the slogan "Vote for the Crook, not the Fascist". Chirac defeated Le Pen by a landslide.

First round

By department

By region

Second round

By department

By region

See also
 Comme un coup de tonnerre
 President of France
 2017 French presidential election
 2022 French presidential election
 1991 Louisiana gubernatorial election, where opponents of former Klansmen and white nationalist David Duke used the slogan "Vote for the Crook: It's Important"

References

Further reading
 Bélanger, Éric, et al. "Party, ideology, and vote intentions: Dynamics from the 2002 French Electoral Panel." Political Research Quarterly 59.4 (2006): 503-515.
 Durand, Claire, André Blais, and Mylène Larochelle. "The polls in the 2002 French presidential election: An autopsy." Public Opinion Quarterly 68.4 (2004): 602-622. Online
 Etienne, Anne. "Do Election Results Represent People's Political Ideologies? A Study of the French 2002 Presidential Elections." French Politics 5.1 (2007): 20–32.
 Gaffney, John, ed. The French Presidential and Legislative Elections of 2002 (2004)
 Gschwend, Thomas, and Dirk Leuffen. "Divided we stand–unified we govern? Cohabitation and regime voting in the 2002 French elections." British Journal of Political Science 35.4 (2005): 691-712. Online
 Laver, Michael, Kenneth Benoit, and Nicolas Sauger. "Policy competition in the 2002 French legislative and presidential elections." European Journal of Political Research 45.4 (2006): 667-697.
 Lewis-Beck, M. ed. The French Voter: Before and After the 2002 Elections (2004).

External links

Official results
  Official results from the Constitutional Council of France : 1st round, 2nd round

Commentary

  2002 Presidential Vote Results by Commune, Politiquemania.com
 French 2002 Presidential Election, Mission of a Delegation from the Canadian Branch of the Canada-France Inter-parliamentary Association
 Analysis of the voting anomaly on FindLaw
 Fascism in France? Commentary on the 2002 French Presidential Elections
 Philosophical considerations of the very singular custom of voting: an analysis based on recent ballots in France

France
 
Presidential election
Presidential election
Presidential elections in France